Nothnegal was a Maldivian heavy metal band from Malé, formed in 2006 by guitarists Hilarl and Fufu. Throughout the band's career, they have released one full-length album, and two EPs, and toured in more than 30 countries around the world. Nothnegal's sound have evolved through a succession of styles, from industrial metal to alternative rock.

History
Nothnegal was formed by guitarists Hilarl and Fufu in 2006.

The band have explored themes of global warming centred around artificial intelligence. Their debut album Decadence tells a story that takes place in a future world that is consumed by water, which is controlled by artificial intelligence. The story is presented in the lyrics in a screenplay format between the individual songs. The story parts link the lyrics of the songs together thematically.

Nothnegal have been honored with a National Youth Award in the band's home country. The Maldives President Mohamed Waheed Hassan presented the National Youth Award 2012 to Nothnegal in the category of Performing Arts.

Awards

Members

Current
 Affan – lead vocals (2011–present)
 Fufu – lead vocals/lead guitar (2006–present)
 Hilarl – lead guitar (2006–present)
 Battery – bass (2007–present)
 Marco Sneck – keyboards (2009–present)
 Kevin Talley – drums, percussion (2009–present)

Live
 Shahaaim – bass (2006–present)

Former
 Avo – lead vocals (2008–2011)
 Shanoon – keyboards (2006–2009)
 Marn – drums, percussion (2006–2009)
 Wadde – lead vocals (2006–2007)
 Khumainy - bass (2006-2007)

Discography
 Antidote of Realism (EP, 2009)
 Decadence (LP, 2012)
 Nothnegal (EP, 2013)

References

Musical groups established in 2006
Maldivian melodic death metal musical groups
Thrash metal musical groups
Power metal musical groups
Season of Mist artists